"Cabinessence" (also typeset as "Cabin Essence") is a song by the American rock band the Beach Boys from their 1969 album 20/20 and their unfinished Smile project. Written by Brian Wilson and Van Dyke Parks, Wilson described the song as a "rock and roll waltz" about railroads, while Parks offered that the pair were attempting to write a song that would end on "a freeze frame of the Union Pacific Railroad". The instrumentation includes banjo, cello, dobro, bouzouki, fuzz-tone bass, trumpet, accordion, and percussion that was arranged to sound like the pounding of rail spikes.

During the initial recording for the song, in late 1966, Parks was called in to the studio to settle a dispute from Mike Love over the lyrics, which Love felt may have contained references to drug culture, something he did not wish to be associated with. Although Parks refused to explain the song to Love, he sang the lines despite his reservations. Parks subsequently disassociated himself from the project, leaving "Cabinessence" unfinished until November 1968, when Wilson's bandmates overdubbed additional vocals onto the recording. It was then included as the closing track on 20/20. Wilson later remade "Cabinessence" as a solo artist for his 2004 album Brian Wilson Presents Smile.

"Cabinessence" remains one of the central pieces of the Smile mythos. In 2011, Mojo issued  "Cabinessence" as a single, backed with "Wonderful", to promote the forthcoming release of The Smile Sessions. In 2012, the magazine ranked it the 11th-greatest Beach Boys song, deeming it "Smile in microcosm" and a "misunderstood masterpiece".  Biographer Jon Stebbins said that its "demonic chanting" exemplified "some of the most haunting, manic, evil-sounding music the Beach Boys ever made".

Background

"Cabinessence" (originally conceived as "Cabin Essence") was written by Brian Wilson and guest lyricist Van Dyke Parks for the Beach Boys' (never-finished) album Smile. Parks told biographer Steven Gaines that he and Wilson had been "trying to write a song that would end on a freeze frame of the Union Pacific Railroad—the guys come together and have their picture taken." In 1990, Wilson wrote, "All my life I've been fascinated by waltzes. By this album I rolled around to doin' what I call a rock and roll waltz with 'Cabin Essence.'"

In April 1969, former band associate Michael Vosse penned an article for Fusion magazine in which he discussed the Smile album. In the article, he mentioned that "Cabinessence" evolved from two different songs called "Who Ran the Iron Horse" and "Home on the Range". According to Vosse, "Home on the Range" "was about this Chinese cat working on the railroad; it had the 'crow' line in it. And another song, 'Bicycle Rider,' was to be integrated with it." On "Who Ran the Iron Horse", "[Brian] had a very definite visual image in mind of a train in motion, and suddenly he stopped in the middle of the song with the 'Grand Coolie' refrain." Vosse also said that Dennis Wilson was originally going to sing "Cabinessence" alone, "and sound like a funky cat up in the mountains somewhere singing to a chick by a fireplace; very simple—and that's all there was to it."

Vosse quoted Wilson's explanation of the song, "Uhm ... This song's about the railroads ... and I wondered what the perspective was of the guy who drove the spike ... those Chinese labormen working on the railroad ... like they'd be hitting the thing ... but looking off, too, and kind of noticing a crow flying overhead ... the Oriental mind going on a different track."

Lyrics

Content
"Cabinessence" is about the arrival of railroads. Journalist Peter Doggett described the song as "trying (among other things) to evoke the essence of life in the cabins for the American pioneers." Clarifying the song's historical references, Parks said:

Dennis Wilson sang a vocal line for the song's second chorus. He later stated, "I got off so much on doing that. It's mixed way down in the track, and it’s syncopated all the way through. Right there is my biggest turn-on." The passage was: "Truck-driving man, do what you can. / High-tail your load off the road, out of night-life. / It's a gas, man. I don’t believe I gotta grieve. / In and out of luck with a buck and a booth. / Catching on to the truth, in the vast past, the last gasp. / In the land, in the dust, trust that you must catch as catch can."

The end of the song features the couplet "Over and over the crow cries uncover the cornfield / Over and over the thresher and hovers the wheatfield". In a 1995 interview, Parks commented, "I have no idea what those words mean. I was perhaps thinking of Van Gogh's wheat field or an idealized agrarian environment. Maybe I meant nothing, but I was trying to follow Brian Wilson's vision at that time."  Journalist Domenic Priore felt that the song "sums up the Western portions of Smile by crossing continents in music".

Artwork

Artist Frank Holmes, who designed the Smile cover artwork, created an illustration that was inspired by the song's lyrics: "Lost and found you still remain there". Along with several other drawings, it was planned to be included within a booklet packaged with the Smile LP. Holmes shared a summary of his design choices in Priore's 2005 book Smile: The Story of Brian Wilson's Lost Masterpiece:

Unused lyrics
Parks wrote additional lyrics that were not used in the song. They were:

Composition
"Cabinessence" has an A/B/A/B/C formal structure. The track begins with a 40-second section called "Home on the Range", with the accompaniment involving piano, banjo, bass, flute, harmonica, and backing vocals singing an ascending "doing" melody. Musician  Mark Johnson referred to the banjo as "traditionally the Great American folk instrument" and likened its use in the song to "part of the soundtrack to a lost Twilight Zone episode".

The next section, "Who Ran the Iron Horse?", contains a more rapturous combination of drums, fuzz bass, cello, and backing vocals. Biographer Jon Stebbins said that the "demonic chanting" exemplified "some of the most haunting, manic, evil-sounding music the Beach Boys ever made". Percussion was arranged to evoke the sound of workers assembling train tracks. PopMatters contributor Thomas Britt noted that the song "contains silences that separate the separate movements of the song, allowing the listener to temporarily reset expectations for the next section."

"Home on the Range" and "Who Ran the Iron Horse?" repeat once and are then followed by "Grand Coolee Dam", which involves the chant "over and over the crow cries uncover the cornfield / over and over the thresher and hovers the wheatfield". This section incorporates a stringed instrument played like a sarod, an instrument associated with Hindustani music. According to journalist Nick Kent, the song "juxtaposed both highly-advanced Western and Eastern musical references" with an "oriental presence". 

Speaking about the song, Al Jardine remembered "a lot of challenging vocal exercises and movements in that one. But we enjoyed those challenges." On page 203 of Priore's 1995 book Look! Listen! Vibrate! Smile!, the Wondermints' Darian Sahanaja scrawled a cartoon bubble phrase above a photo of Carl Wilson that joked of the song, "‘So! You expect us to play half-note triplets in 3/4 time and still keep up with your harmonies ON STAGE … DO YA?!?!?!’"

Recording

Smile sessions
Wilson produced "Cabinessence" in the same modular fashion as "Good Vibrations". Instrumental tracking for the "Home on the Range" section was recorded on October 3, 1966 at Gold Star Studios with engineer Larry Levine. A vocal and instrumental session for "Home On the Range" was taped on October 11 at Western Studio. Carl also overdubbed guitar on "Home on the Range" at this session. The next day, Brian produced the "Grand Coulee Dam" section at Columbia studio. In 1990, Wilson wrote, "The night I cut the instrumental part of ['Cabinessence'] no one could believe that a waltz could rock that hard. I had the 6-string bass player play electric fuzz tones. This got it goin' good. I was sure that I had recorded the most rockin' waltz ever recorded."

On December 6, further vocal overdubs were tracked at Columbia for "Cabinessence", a session that included the recording of Mike Love's singing on "The Grand Coulee Dam". Love did not understand the lyrics "over and over the crow cries uncover the cornfield" and thought that the song may have contained references to drug culture, something that he did not wish to be associated with.  He took to characterizing Parks' lyrics as "acid alliteration".

To settle this dispute, Brian telephoned Parks and asked him to come to the studio. Prior to this meeting, the only Beach Boy besides Brian that Parks had interacted with was Dennis, who approved the lyrics, and Parks expected that the rest of the band would similarly approve. Upon arrival to the studio, Parks refused to explain the song to Love and responded by simply stating he did not know the meaning of the lyric. When Parks was interviewed for the 1976 television special The Beach Boys: It's OK!, he characterized the song as part of an "American Gothic"-style piece and remembered, "I said [to Mike], 'I don't know what these lyrics are about. They aren't important, throw them away.'"

According to biographer Peter Ames Carlin, Parks had been unwilling to be drawn into an argument over the quality of his work. Love reflected that Parks did not appear insulted by his questioning, but speculated that Parks may have feigned ignorance of the song's meaning "just because I was there in his face." In another interview from 2004, Parks said that he had been "physically afraid" of Love, "because Brian had confided to me what Mike had done to him", but did not elaborate further. In a 2013 interview, Parks surmised, "I don't think the crows created a problem at all. I think the music created the problem for Mike, and it was perfectly understandable that he was terribly jealous of me, as it became evident that he wanted my job [as Brian's lyricist]. And I did not want a job that somebody else wanted."

Love sang the line despite his reservations. On December 27, 1966, further vocals were recorded at Western for the "Who Ran the Iron Horse" section. By April 1967, Parks had withdrawn from the project, which was shelved soon therafter. He later cited the "Cabinessence" dispute as the moment when "the whole house of cards began tumbling down".

20/20 sessions
On November 20, 1968, "Cabinessence" was given additional vocal overdubs by Carl and Dennis Wilson at Capitol Studios for the group's forthcoming album 20/20. According to Carlin, Brian was opposed to the inclusion of the track and did not participate on the track with the rest of the band. Engineer Stephen Desper commented that "Cabinessence" was "finished, more or less, with Brian's guidance through Carl." Mixing for the song was completed on November 22.

20/20 was issued by Capitol in February 1969 with "Cabinessence" as the album's closing track. Biographer David Leaf wrote that there were reportedly "twenty-five different mixes and combinations" of "Cabinessence" that had been pressed on acetate discs before the group settled on the version they released. In his Fusion article, Vosse claimed that the 20/20 recording was "new, because before his ear operation about a year ago, Brian could not hear in stereo." However, Wilson's surgery had actually failed to restore his hearing, and the only new contents on the 20/20 track were the vocal overdubs from Carl and Dennis.

Critical reception
According to ethnomusicologist David Toop, when 20/20 was released, the inclusion of "Cabinessence" was "the biggest thrill" for "true fans" of Beach Boys, even though "it didn't make a lot of sense" as the album's closing track. In his contemporary review of the 20/20 album, Rolling Stones Arthur Schmidt wrote that the song was "one of the finest things Brian has ever done ... The totally orchestrated cacophony was an innovation in rock when they used it in Smiley Smile, and is still done here better than anywhere else. Piano imitates ukulele, and the solo vocal is gentle, but brilliant." An uncredited writer from Hit Parader opined that "Cabinessence" was a "highly imaginative mini-rock symphony ... with complex orchestral arrangements built around complex vocal arrangements. ... an incredible dynamic piece of music without the cleverness of 'Good Vibrations'."

Retrospectively, academic John Covach wrote that although the song "seems lyrically disorganized and more episodic than even the alternate version of 'Heroes and Villains' ... it does have that aura of manic brilliance that characterized Brian's work before the collapse of Smile". Taylor Parkes of The Quietus wrote that although Wilson and Parks' original concept for the song "proved somewhat overambitious ... instead we got the final section of 'Cabin Essence', one of the most beautiful and deeply evocative pieces of music we're ever likely to hear; the next best thing."  In Johnson's belief, the song could be viewed as "an exploration a la John Steinbeck of what American music's function really is. To simply fill a room, while we go about our days and nights."

In 2012, Mojo ranked it number 11 in the magazine's list of the greatest Beach Boys songs. Its entry stated, "Cabinessence is Smile in microcosm. Vast in scope, unprecedented in its ambition and as much an unsolved sonic riddle as the album it had been written for, this was the misunderstood masterpiece that caused Mike Love to crack and the project to flounder."

Legacy

In the early 1990s, producer Terry Melcher invited Parks to play synthesizer on the group's album Summer in Paradise (1992). When Parks arrived at Melcher's home in Monterey, he found Love meditating in the living room. As Parks recalled in a 1995 interview, "For the first time in 30 years, he was able to ask me directly, once again, 'What do those lyrics -- Over and over the crow flies, uncover the cornfield -- mean?' And I was able to tell him, once again, 'I don't know.'" Afterward, Love joined Parks on his flight back to Los Angeles. "We had a nice chat and he insisted that he wanted to split the cost of the flight with me, so he gave me a card with his number on it. The next morning, I called to discover it was a disconnected number. And that was the last time I saw Mike Love."

In 2001, after joining Brian's supporting band, Darian Sahanaja lobbied for "Cabinessence" to be performed at the "All-Star Tribute to Brian Wilson" concert held at Radio City Music Hall, however, the song was not played due to its complexity. It was later included in Wilson's concert setlists, in medley with "Wonderful", and then for Brian Wilson Presents Smile (2004).

Writing his 2006 biography of Wilson, Peter Ames Carlin wrote that the "Cabinessence" lyric dispute between Love and Parks "has long become a central piece of the Smile legend, both because it marked a turning point in the album’s progress and because it resonates with so much psychological and cultural subtext." In a 2012 interview, Parks stated that, when people asked him for his thoughts on the release of The Smile Sessions, "I tell them with how happy I am to see the lads finally eat that crow over the cornfield."

Personnel
Per band archivist Craig Slowinski.

The Beach Boys
Al Jardine – vocals ("doing-doing", chorus, and tag)
Bruce Johnston – vocals (chorus and tag)
Mike Love – vocals (lead, chorus, and tag)
Brian Wilson – vocals ("doing-doing", chorus, and tag)
Carl Wilson – vocals ("doing-doing", lead, chorus, and tag), acoustic guitar
Dennis Wilson – vocals ("Truck Drivin' Man", chorus, and tag)

Guest
Van Dyke Parks – upright piano

Session musicians (later known as "the Wrecking Crew")

Jimmy Bond, Jr. – upright bass
James Burton – dobro
Jesse Ehrlich – cello
Carl Fortina – accordion
Jim Gordon – tambourine with a stick (chorus), "bell goodies" (tag)
Armand Kaproff – cello
Carol Kaye – banjo
Jay Migliori – flute
Oliver Mitchell – trumpet
Tommy Morgan – harmonica, bass harmonica (chorus)
Bill Pitman – Danelectro fuzz bass (chorus)
Lyle Ritz – upright bass
Tommy Tedesco – acoustic guitar, bouzouki (tag)

Notes

References

Bibliography

Further reading

External links

 ‘Smile’ – My First 25 Years : Cabin Essence, lost and found…
 ‘Smile’ – My First 25 Years : Cabinessence, uncovering the cornfield…
 ‘Smile’ – My First 25 Years : Canibessence, doobie doo or not doobie…

1969 songs
The Beach Boys songs
Brian Wilson songs
Songs written by Brian Wilson
Songs written by Van Dyke Parks
Song recordings produced by Brian Wilson
Capitol Records singles
Songs about trains
Songs about cannabis
Songs based on American history
2011 singles
Musical compositions completed by others